Emarcusia morroensis, common name Morro Bay Aeolid, is a species of sea slug, specifically an aeolid nudibranch. It is a marine gastropod mollusc in the family Facelinidae.

Distribution
The holotype of this species was found at Morro Bay, San Luis Obispo County, California. It is found on the Californian coast from Fort Baker, Marin County to San Diego.

References

External links

Facelinidae
Gastropods described in 1972